The 2003 Delaware Fightin' Blue Hens football team represented the University of Delaware as a member of the Atlantic 10 Conference (A-10) during the 2003 NCAA Division I-AA football season. Led by second-year head coach K. C. Keeler, the Fightin' Blue Hens compiled an overall record of 15–1 with a mark of 8–1 in conference play, sharing the A-10 with UMass. Delaware advanced to the NCAA Division I-AA Football Championship playoffs, where the Fightin' Blue Hens beat Southern Illinois in the first round, Northern Iowa in the quarterfinals, Wofford in the semifinals, and Colgate in the  NCAA Division I-AA Championship Game. The team played home games at Delaware Stadium in Newark, Delaware.

Schedule

Roster

References

Delaware
Delaware Fightin' Blue Hens football seasons
NCAA Division I Football Champions
Atlantic 10 Conference football champion seasons
Delaware Fightin' Blue Hens football